Aaron Sebastián Astudillo Quiñones (born 17 April 2000) is a Venezuelan-born Chilean professional footballer who plays as a right-back for Chilean club Deportes Recoleta on loan from Universidad Católica.

Career

Universidad Catolica
Astudillo debuted the year 2020 in the match against Everton in Estadio Sausalito, on the following date.

Career statistics

Club

Honours

Club
Universidad Católica

Primera División de Chile: 2020

References

External links
 

2000 births
Living people
Venezuelan footballers
Naturalized citizens of Chile
Venezuela youth international footballers
Association football forwards
Chilean Primera División players
Club Deportivo Universidad Católica footballers
Deportes Melipilla footballers
Expatriate footballers in Chile
People from Ciudad Guayana